Jan-Erik Aarberg (29 October 1924 – 26 June 1994) was a Norwegian sailor and engineer by trade. He was born in Oslo. He competed at the 1972 Summer Olympics in Munich.

References

External links

1924 births
1994 deaths
Sportspeople from Oslo
Olympic sailors of Norway
Norwegian male sailors (sport)
Sailors at the 1968 Summer Olympics – Dragon
Sailors at the 1972 Summer Olympics – Dragon